Steen Klaaborg Secher (born 9 April 1959 in Torsted, Horsens, Midtjylland) is a Danish sailor and Olympic champion.

He received a bronze medal in the Soling Class at the 1988 Summer Olympics in Seoul. He won a gold medal at the 1992 Summer Olympics in Barcelona.

References

External links
 
 
 

1959 births
Living people
Danish male sailors (sport)
Sailors at the 1988 Summer Olympics – Soling
Sailors at the 1992 Summer Olympics – Soling
Olympic sailors of Denmark
Olympic gold medalists for Denmark
Olympic medalists in sailing
H-boat class sailors
European Champions Soling
People from Horsens Municipality
Medalists at the 1992 Summer Olympics
Medalists at the 1988 Summer Olympics
Olympic bronze medalists for Denmark
Sportspeople from the Central Denmark Region